Gareth Stuart Gwillim (born 9 January 1983) is an English professional footballer who plays for Ebbsfleet United as a left back.

Career
Born in Farnborough, London, Gwillim began his career as a junior at Welling United and Crystal Palace, before moving into non-League football, playing for such teams as Farnborough Town, Ashford Town (Kent), Bishop's Stortford and Histon.

After Histon rejected a formal approach from Dagenham & Redbridge in November 2009, Gwillim eventually signed for Dagenham & Redbridge in June 2010 on a two-year deal. Gwillim made his professional debut on 31 August 2010, in a 0–1 defeat in the Football League Trophy against Charlton Athletic. After the match, Gwillim publicly announced his plans to usurp Damien McCrory as the club's first-choice left back. Gwillim made his debut in the Football League on 21 September 2010.

On 13 January 2011, Gwillim agreed a loan deal with AFC Wimbledon, playing with them in the 2011 Conference play-off final. Gwillim signed permanently for the club in July 2011. He then returned to non-league football with Sutton United and Ebbsfleet United.

References

1983 births
Living people
English footballers
Association football fullbacks
Welling United F.C. players
Crystal Palace F.C. players
Farnborough F.C. players
Ashford United F.C. players
Bishop's Stortford F.C. players
Histon F.C. players
Dagenham & Redbridge F.C. players
AFC Wimbledon players
Sutton United F.C. players
Ebbsfleet United F.C. players
English Football League players
National League (English football) players